René Vingerhoet (27 August 1912 – 3 September 2008) was a Belgian rower. He competed in the men's coxed four at the 1936 Summer Olympics.

References

1912 births
2008 deaths
Belgian male rowers
Olympic rowers of Belgium
Rowers at the 1936 Summer Olympics
Sportspeople from Brussels